Below are the rosters for teams competing in the 2018 World Junior Ice Hockey Championships.

Group A

Head coach:  Dominique Ducharme

Head coach:  Olaf Eller

Head coach:  Jussi Ahokas

Head coach:  Ernest Bokroš

Head coach:  Bob Motzko

Group B

Head coach:  Yuri Faikov

Head coach:  Filip Pešán

Head coach:  Valeri Bragin

Head coach:  Tomas Montén

Head coach:  Christian Wohlwend

External links
WM20 - International Ice Hockey Federation
Buffalo World Juniors

Rosters
World Junior Ice Hockey Championships rosters